The League of Ireland Premier Division, also known as the SSE Airtricity League Premier Division for sponsorship reasons, is the top level division in both the League of Ireland and the Republic of Ireland football league system. The division was formed in 1985 following a reorganisation of the League of Ireland. St Patrick's Athletic and Bohemians are the only current League of Ireland clubs never to have been relegated from the Premier Division.  The league has been won on multiple occasions by Northern Ireland-based club Derry City, the presence of which within the league makes it a cross-border competition. Since 2003, the Premier Division has operated as a summer league.

History

1980s
The inaugural members of the Premier Division included the League of Ireland's traditional top four clubs – Shamrock Rovers, Shelbourne, Bohemians and Dundalk plus eight other clubs. Shamrock Rovers were the inaugural champions and then retained the title in 1986–87. This saw Rovers complete a four in a row of league titles. Dundalk were champions in 1987–88 and Derry City achieved a treble in 1988–89 by also winning the League of Ireland Cup and the FAI Cup.

1990s
The 1990s saw the re-emergence of St Patrick's Athletic following years of obscurity. During the decade St Pat's won four titles. Brian Kerr guided the club to success in 1989–90 and 1995–96 before Pat Dolan and Liam Buckley added further titles in 1997–98 and 1998–99. The 1992–93 season saw Cork City win their first title in dramatic circumstances after a series of three-way play-offs that also involved Bohemians and Shelbourne.

2000s
The turn of the century saw Shelbourne win the first of five titles in seven years.
Dermot Keely guided Shelbourne to the title in 1999–2000 and 2001–02. Shelbourne won the title in controversial circumstances in 2001–02. They were only declared champions after St Patrick's Athletic were deducted 15 points for fielding Charles Livingstone Mbabazi while he was ineligible.

The league decided to become a summer league in 2003. Pat Fenlon added further titles in 2003, 2004 and 2006. Fenlon had also been a prominent member of the Shelbourne playing squads in 1999–2000 and 2001–02. As a manager Fenlon would also guide Bohemians to title successes in 2008 and 2009. Cork City denied Shelbourne a third league title in a row when they claimed their second title in 2005, defeating fellow challengers Derry City in a last game decider at Turners Cross.

During the second half of the decade a number of Premier Division clubs suffered financial difficulties. During the 2005 season Shamrock Rovers entered into examinership and it was revealed that the club had debts of nearly €3 million. It was also discovered that Rovers were not paying PAYE and PRSI taxes. As a result of these financial irregularities, Rovers were deducted eight points. This ultimately resulted in the club being relegated to the First Division after they lost the relegation/promotion playoff to Dublin City. This was the first time Rovers' senior team had dropped out of the top level of the Republic of Ireland football league system since the club had joined the League of Ireland in 1922–23. During the 2006 season the Revenue Commissioners took High Court action and threatened to have Shelbourne wound up after the club failed to pay more than €104,000 in outstanding taxes. Shelbourne also struggled to pay its players during the season. Despite winning the title Shelbourne were subsequently demoted to the First Division due to their financial difficulties. Midway through the season Dublin City also went out of business and withdrew from the league, unable to complete the season. During the 2008 season both Cork City and Drogheda United were deducted ten points after going into administration. Following the conclusion of the 2009 season both Derry City and Cork City were expelled from the League of Ireland. Derry City were accused of making extra payments to players using unofficial secondary contracts. This was against league rules which placed limits on the amount clubs could spend on players' wages. Cork City had been in serious financial difficulties for several seasons and its holding company was eventually wound up by the High Court. However both clubs were effectively reformed and were subsequently allowed to join the 2010 First Division.

2010s
The 2010s have been one of contrasting fortunes for Premier Division clubs. Under Michael O'Neill, Shamrock Rovers finished as Premier Division champions in 2010 and 2011. In 2011 Rovers also created history when they became the first team in League of Ireland history to qualify for the group stages of the UEFA Europa League. In 2012 Sligo Rovers won their first Premier Division title and their first top level title in thirty five years. St. Patrick's Athletic won their fifth Premier Division in 2013. Under Stephen Kenny, Dundalk emulated Shamrock Rovers, winning the title in 2014 and 2015 titles before qualifying for the group stages of the 2016–17 UEFA Europa League.

In contrast three Premier Division clubs – Sporting Fingal, Galway United and Monaghan United – all withdrew from the League of Ireland. Sporting Fingal also went out of business completely.

Europe
The top team in the Premier Division currently qualifies for the UEFA Champions League first qualifying round. The second-placed and third placed-teams and winners of the FAI Cup qualify for the UEFA Europa Conference League first qualifying round. Shamrock Rovers and Dundalk have both qualified for the group stages of the UEFA Europa League. In 2011, Rovers became the first team in League of Ireland history to reach the group stages and Dundalk repeated the feat in 2016 and 2020. In 2018, UEFA changed the structure of qualification for the Champions League; giving an extra four automatic qualification spots to the top four leagues in Europe. To compensate for that change, an extra round was added to the qualifying stages of the Champions League and the Europa League which made qualification more difficult for League of Ireland clubs. In 2021, the league will have its Europa League qualifying places revoked and replaced by Europa Conference League places as part of UEFA's restructuring of European football.

the Republic of Ireland are currently ranked 35th for the 2023 season with some potential for improvement. the country co-efficient has surpassed three points (3.125) for an individual season and the 2023 ranking score is now over 10 points (10.125) for the first time ever.Between 1998 and 2010, the league's place on the coefficient table rose 15 places, the biggest climb of any league in Europe. Its position of 29th in 2010 was also its highest since 1986. Since June 2010, the league's ranking has declined and it stood at 43rd place at the end of the 2013/2014 season, a drop of 14 places since 2010 and the league's worst ranking since 1998. In the 2000s, the Premier Division's coefficient vastly improved relative to the late 1990s, but at a cost. The introduction of full-time professional football by a number of clubs and the league's decision to become a summer league in 2003, improved the performance of Premier Division clubs in Europe. Increased fitness levels resulted from both, while full-time professionalism retained Irish players within the league, attracted foreign players to the league and generally improved the standard of football. At least one League of Ireland club has progressed to the next round of a European competition in every season from 2003 to 2014.

However, the costs associated with professional football and the pursuit of European success have been blamed for the financial difficulties suffered by Premier Division clubs. This period of improvement came to an end in 2010 with the league's ranking dropping. From 29th in 2010, it dropped to 31st in 2011, 33rd in 2012, 36th in 2013 and 43rd for the 2014 rankings. The league recovered to 40th for the 2015 rankings and finished 41st in the 2016 rankings.

Competition format
There are 10 clubs in the Premier Division. During the course of a season (from February to November) each club plays the others four times (a quadruple round-robin system), twice at their home stadium and twice at that of their opponents, for 36 games. Teams receive three points for a win and one point for a draw. No points are awarded for a loss. Teams are ranked by total points, then goal difference, and then goals scored. If still equal, teams are deemed to occupy the same position. If there is a tie for the championship, for relegation, or for qualification to other competitions, the head-to-head record between the tied teams is taken into consideration (points scored in the matches between the teams, followed by away goals in those matches.)

Promotion and Relegation

A promotion and relegation system has existed between the Premier Division and the League of Ireland First Division since 1985–86. The bottom team in the Premier Division is relegated, and the second-from-bottom plays the second-from-top of the First Division for the final spot in the Premier Division. In 1992–93 a promotion/relegation play-off was also introduced. The bottom team in the Premier Division is relegated, and the second-from-bottom plays the second-from-top of the First Division for the final spot in the Premier Division.

In 2008 Cobh Ramblers were relegated directly from the Premier Division to the 2009 A Championship after they failed to obtain a First Division license.  In 2017, to even up the numbers of clubs in the Premier Division and First Division to 10 teams each, the bottom three Premier League teams were relegated and only the First Division champion were promoted.

Current season

2023 season
Ten clubs will compete in the 2023 League of Ireland Premier Division, with one promoted from the First Division: 

UCD were relegated to the First Division for the 2023 season, while Cork City, as winners, were promoted from the 2022 season.

List of winners by season

Champions

By club

By locations
By province

By county

By city/town

Managers

List of wins by manager

Current managers

Top scorers

Player of the Year

Attendance

Trophy

The current League of Ireland trophy was unveiled on 31 October 2007 by the Football Association of Ireland. It stands at 91 cm (36 inches) tall with a circumference of 83 cm (33 inches). It is a Sterling Silver trophy consisting of silver and a mass of other metals including copper. The design of the trophy consists of a silver football at the top, which is encompassed by the cup itself. Drogheda United were the first team to receive the newly created trophy on 2 November 2007.

Sponsorship
The Premier Division has been sponsored since the early 1990s. The sponsor has been able to determine the league's sponsorship name. There have been three sponsors since the league's formation.
 1990's: Bord Gáis (Bord Gáis League Premier Division) and Harp Lager
 2000–2008: Eircom (Eircom League Premier Division)
 2010–present: SSE Airtricity (Airtricity League Premier Division)

The league had no title sponsor in 2009, but had a number of secondary sponsors including Newstalk and Electronic Arts. As well as sponsorship for the league itself, the Premier Division has a number of official partners and suppliers. The official ball supplier for the league is Umbro. The official drink for the league is Lucozade. The official radio and newspaper partners are Newstalk and Irish Daily Star.

See also
 League of Ireland
 League of Ireland First Division
 Republic of Ireland football league system
 List of foreign League of Ireland players

Notes

References

External links

 
1985 establishments in Ireland
1
1
Sports leagues established in 1985
Summer association football leagues
Ireland
Professional sports leagues in Ireland